Ralf Schmidt (born 9 October 1985 in Jena) is a German former footballer.

Career 
He previously played for 1. FC Nürnberg. He was an integral part of the team that won Jena's promotion to the second division in 2006. Playing in 32 games he caught the eye of former Jena and now Nürnberg coach Hans Meyer and signed the 21-year-old on a three-year contract. To further his development, Schmidt was sent back to Jena on loan for one more year before joining the FCN squad in the summer of 2007. However, Schmidt was not able to play for the entire second half of the 2006–2007 season being sidelined with a shoulder injury. Before his injury he played in 14 Second Division matches for Jena's first team.

References

1985 births
Living people
German footballers
FC Carl Zeiss Jena players
1. FC Nürnberg players
Bundesliga players
3. Liga players
Association football defenders
Sportspeople from Jena